Asif Ahmed (born 17 December 1992) is a Bangladeshi first-class cricketer who plays for the Barisal Division. He made his Twenty20 debut for Chittagong Kings in the 2012, Bangladesh Premier League 10 February 2012

References

1992 births
Living people
Bangladeshi cricketers
Barisal Division cricketers
Khulna Tigers cricketers
Rajshahi Royals cricketers
Dhaka Metropolis cricketers
Chattogram Challengers cricketers
Legends of Rupganj cricketers
Cricket Coaching School cricketers
Prime Doleshwar Sporting Club cricketers
Bangladesh East Zone cricketers
Bangladesh Central Zone cricketers
Bangladesh under-23 cricketers
Cricketers from Dhaka
South Asian Games gold medalists for Bangladesh
South Asian Games medalists in cricket